John Edward "Jed" York (born March 9, 1981) is an American businessman who is the CEO of the San Francisco 49ers NFL franchise. York is the son of Denise DeBartolo York and John York, and nephew of former 49ers owner Edward J. DeBartolo Jr.

Early life
Born and raised in Youngstown, Ohio, York attended St. Charles Elementary School and Cardinal Mooney High School.  While in high school he was a baseball team captain and the senior class president. He graduated from the University of Notre Dame with a bachelor's degree in Finance and History.

Career 
York began work as a financial analyst for Guggenheim Partners at their New York City offices, but left after approximately one year. After he quit his first job, York's parents brought him into their family owned team, the San Francisco 49ers, as director of strategic planning and later promoted him to vice president of strategic planning.

In December 2008, Jed became president of the 49ers, with his parents transitioning to the posts of co-chairmen. In making the announcement, his father, John, said that Jed's previous posts served as an opportunity for him to learn how to run a major league franchise. While Jed is the operating head of the 49ers, his parents remained principal owners, and are responsible for providing resources and representing the 49ers at league meetings.

In October 2010, with the 49ers off to an 0–5 start, York wrote to ESPN's Adam Schefter that the 49ers would win their division and make the playoffs.  This proclamation led ESPN columnist David Fleming to refer to York as "kooky" and "goofy" and to note that York "backs up such bold declarations with a long list of qualifications starting with (1) his lifelong love of the 49ers, (2) his prestigious high school baseball career and (3) the fact that his godfather is Eddie DeBartolo."  However, the 49ers did come within one game of backing up York's assertion. In 2011, the Niners finished the season 13–3 with the 2nd seed in the National Football Conference.  In the divisional round, the 49ers defeated the New Orleans Saints. The 49ers then hosted the NFC Championship game against the New York Giants, eventually losing, 20–17. The success of the 2011 San Francisco 49ers was with much of the same team from 2010, but largely accomplished with the key addition of first-year head coach Jim Harbaugh.

In 2012, York was replaced by Gideon Yu as team president, although he retained the title of CEO.

After a 19–3 loss to the Seattle Seahawks in November 2014, York tweeted “Thank you 49ers faithful for coming out strong tonight. This performance wasn't acceptable. I apologize for that.” This public statement sparked a media frenzy about York's intent behind the Tweet and whether he was specifically referring to Coach Jim Harbaugh's future.

The decision to fire head coach Jim Harbaugh prompted an outcry from the media and the 49ers fan base. In a press conference addressing the issue, Jed York was quoted as saying, “It's up to us to make sure we compete for and win Super Bowls. That's our only goal. We don't raise division championship banners, we don't raise NFC Championship banners. We raise Super Bowl banners. And whenever we don't deliver that, I hope that you will hold me directly responsible and accountable for it. And we look forward to getting this thing back on track.” Commenting on York's ability to manage the critical relationship between the general manager and the head coach, Michael Rosenberg wrote in Sports Illustrated, "he failed completely." Rosenberg also described York's impact on the broader 49ers organization, noting that "York has created a culture that encourages selfishness, weakness and back-stabbing." Throughout the season, there were numerous leaks to the media from within the 49ers organization criticizing Coach Harbaugh. San Jose Mercury News columnist Tim Kawakami noted "York and [General Manager, Trent] Baalke were the primary sources for the off-the-record disclosures that undercut Harbaugh's tenure."

Trent Baalke replaced former head coach Jim Harbaugh with Jim Tomsula, but York supported the change comparing it to the Golden State Warriors firing Mark Jackson and replacing him with Steve Kerr.  San Jose Mercury News columnist Tim Kawakami criticized Jed's Kerr comparison in an article titled "49ers' Jed York clueless in comparing Tomsula to Warriors' Kerr." Tomsula lasted one season, leading the 49ers to a 5–11 record before being fired on Jan. 3, 2016.  However, according to Adam Gase, it was Trent Baalke and not Jed York who decided to make Tomsula head coach instead of Gase.

Soccer investment
York ventured into soccer, investing into Sacramento Republic FC in January 2015 who play in United Soccer League, with future plans to venture into the MLS as a franchise and build a new stadium. On 24 May 2018, English football club Leeds United announced that 49ers Enterprises had bought shares in the club to become a minority investor, the 49ers Enterprises is the business arm of the NFL side San Francisco 49ers.

Affiliations
As of 2023, York is serving as chairman of the Silicon Valley Leadership Group's board of directors.

Personal life
York and his wife Danielle have two sons. The family resides in Los Altos Hills, California. York is the son of Denise DeBartolo York and John York. York has a younger brother and two younger sisters.

References

External links
 Executive Profile at San Francisco Business Times

Living people
National Football League team presidents
San Francisco 49ers executives
San Francisco 49ers owners
DeBartolo family
1980 births
University of Notre Dame alumni